3 Strikes (Original Motion Picture Soundtrack) is the soundtrack to DJ Pooh's 2000 comedy film 3 Strikes. It was released on February 22, 2000 via Priority Records and consists of hip hop music. Recording sessions took place at Mirror Image Studios and at Daddy's House Recording Studio in New York, at Digital Shack and at Record Plant in Los Angeles, and at Poli's Crib. Production was handled by DJ Battlecat, Funk Daddy, Jaz-O, J Dub, Kardinal Offishall, Ke'Noe, Poli Paul, Rico Lumpkins, Saint Denson, Dr. Nabu and DJ Pooh, who also served as executive producer with Andrew Shack and Marcus Morton. It features contributions from Blue, Choclair, C-Murder, Da Howg, E-40, Kam, Likwit Crew, Lil Zane, Nio Renee, Ras Kass, Sauce Money, Shawn Fonteno, Silkk the Shocker, Tha Eastsidaz and Total.

The soundtrack was not much of a success, peaking at #190 on the Billboard 200 and #52 on the Top R&B/Hip-Hop Albums. The film's score was composed by Stewart Copeland.

Track listing

Charts

References

External links

2000 soundtrack albums
Hip hop soundtracks
Comedy film soundtracks
Gangsta rap soundtracks
Albums produced by DJ Pooh
Priority Records soundtracks
Contemporary R&B soundtracks
Albums produced by Kardinal Offishall
Albums produced by Battlecat (producer)